Hellinsia postnigrata is a moth of the family Pterophoridae. It is found in Ecuador.

Adults are on wing in May, at an altitude of 1,300 m.

References

Moths described in 2011
postnigrata
Moths of South America